Special Delivery is the twenty-second solo studio album by American country artist, Dottie West. The album was released in 1979 on Liberty Records and was produced by Randy Goodrum and Brent Maher. The album came on the heels of two chart-topping West duet albums with Kenny Rogers and reestablished West as a major solo artist, becoming West's most successful solo album since 1967, thanks in part to three top 15 country hits on the collection, including "A Lesson in Leavin'", the first solo number one record in West's 20-year career.

Background and critical reception 
Special Delivery consisted of ten tracks of material and was her first release for Liberty Records (which was previously United Artists Records). The album's tenth track was a cover version of Bob Seger's "We've Got Tonight", which later became a Kenny Rogers and Sheena Easton duet in 1983.  Producers Randy Goodrum and Brent Maher also co-wrote most of the album's tracks, including the singles, "A Lesson in Leavin'," "You Pick Me Up (And Put Me Down)," and "Leavin's for Unbelievers". The album was reviewed by Allmusic'''s Tom Roland, who gave the release three out of five stars. Roland also found that West's music style seemed to adapt to the new Urban Cowboy musical style, similar to that of Rogers, stating, "Her 'Country Sunshine' is replaced with country-funk and a touch of melancholy." The album was released on a 12-inch LP album, containing five tracks on each side of the record.

 Release Special Delivery's lead single was the opening track, "You Pick Me Up and Put Me Down." The song was released in October 1979, one month before the album, and peaked at #12 on the Billboard Magazine Hot Country Songs chart and #50 on the Billboard Hot Adult Contemporary Tracks chart by the end of the year. Upon the November release of Special Delivery, it peaked at #13 on the Billboard Top Country Albums chart. The album's second track, "A Lesson in Leavin'" was the second single in February 1980. The song became West's first number one single as a solo artist on the Hot Country Songs chart. In addition, it also peaked at #73 on the Billboard Hot 100 and #42 on the Hot Adult Contemporary Tracks chart. The third and final single, "Leavin's for Unbelievers" was released in June 1980, and peaked at #13 on the Billboard'' Hot Country Songs chart later in the year.

Track listing

Personnel 
 Randy Goodrum – producer
 Brent Maher – producer
 Dottie West – lead vocals

Charts

Weekly charts

Singles

References 

1980 albums
Dottie West albums
Liberty Records albums
Albums produced by Brent Maher
Albums produced by Larry Butler (producer)